Friederike Belcher ( Ziegelmayer, born 6 March 1982 in Berlin) is a German sailor. She competed in the 2012 Summer Olympics, in the Women's 470 class.

She is married to multiple Olympic gold medalist Australian sailor Mathew Belcher and Granddaughter of sailing bronze medalist Rolf Mulka and great great Granddaughter of the Nazi war criminal Robert Mulka who was second in command of Auschwitz. Her father company based in Germany "Ziegelmayer" is one of the primary boatbuilder for the 470 class.

References

External links 
 
 
 
 

1982 births
Living people
German female sailors (sport)
Olympic sailors of Germany
Sailors at the 2012 Summer Olympics – 470